John Millman was the defending champion but chose not to defend his title.

Ernesto Escobedo won the title after defeating Frances Tiafoe 6–2, 6–7(6–8), 7–6(7–3) in the final.

Seeds

Draw

Finals

Top half

Bottom half

References
 Main Draw
 Qualifying Draw

2016 MS
Kentucky Bank Tennis Championships - Singles